William Henry Carter (September 8, 1889 – death date unknown) was an American Negro league catcher in the 1920s.

A native of Houston, Texas, Carter played for the Detroit Stars in 1920. In nine recorded games, he posted two hits in 27 plate appearances.

References

External links
 and Seamheads

1889 births
Year of death missing
Place of death missing
Detroit Stars players